Food, Inc.: How Industrial Food Is Making Us Sicker, Fatter, and Poorer — And What You Can Do About It is a 2009 companion book to the documentary film of the same name about the industrialization of food production and about the negative results to human health and to the natural environment. Edited by Karl Weber, the book is co-published by Participant Media and PublicAffairs Books.

See also
Chicken: The Dangerous Transformation of America's Favorite Food (book)
A Delicate Balance — The Truth (film)
The Dorito Effect: The Surprising New Truth about Food and Flavor (book)
Food Fight: The Inside Story of the Food Industry (book)

External links
A film that will make you think before you eat 
Participant Media Adds Book Arm - 6/15/2009 - Publishers Weekly
Daily Green : Food Inc. Movie: Dishing Dirt on the Food Industry

Environmental non-fiction books
2009 non-fiction books
2009 in the environment
Agricultural economics
Agriculture books
Intensive farming
PublicAffairs books